In biology, depolarization or hypopolarization  is a change within a cell, during which the cell undergoes a shift in electric charge distribution, resulting in less negative charge inside the cell compared to the outside. Depolarization is essential to the function of many cells, communication between cells, and the overall physiology of an organism.

Most cells in higher organisms maintain an internal environment that is negatively charged relative to the cell's exterior. This difference in charge is called the cell's membrane potential. In the process of depolarization, the negative internal charge of the cell temporarily becomes more positive (less negative). This shift from a negative to a more positive membrane potential occurs during several processes, including an action potential. During an action potential, the depolarization is so large that the potential difference across the cell membrane briefly reverses polarity, with the inside of the cell becoming positively charged.

The change in charge typically occurs due to an influx of sodium ions into a cell, although it can be mediated by an influx of any kind of cation or efflux of any kind of anion. The opposite of a depolarization is called a hyperpolarization.

Usage of the term "depolarization" in biology differs from its use in physics, where it refers to situations in which any form of polarity (i.e. the presence of any electrical charge, whether positive or negative) changes to a value of zero.

Depolarization is sometimes referred to as "hypopolarization" (as opposed to hyperpolarization).

Physiology

The process of depolarization is entirely dependent upon the intrinsic electrical nature of most cells. When a cell is at rest, the cell maintains what is known as a resting potential. The resting potential generated by nearly all cells results in the interior of the cell having a negative charge compared to the exterior of the cell. To maintain this electrical imbalance, microscopic positively and negatively charged particles called ions are transported across the cell's plasma membrane. The transport of the ions across the plasma membrane is accomplished through several different types of transmembrane proteins embedded in the cell's plasma membrane that function as pathways for ions both into and out of the cell, such as ion channels, sodium potassium pumps, and voltage-gated ion channels.

Resting potential
The resting potential must be established within a cell before the cell can be depolarized. There are many mechanisms by which a cell can establish a resting potential, however there is a typical pattern of generating this resting potential that many cells follow. The cell uses ion channels, ion pumps, and voltage-gated ion channels to generate a negative resting potential within the cell. However, the process of generating the resting potential within the cell also creates an environment outside the cell that favors depolarization. The sodium potassium pump is largely responsible for the optimization of conditions on both the interior and the exterior of the cell for depolarization. By pumping three positively charged sodium ions (Na+) out of the cell for every two positively charged potassium ions (K+) pumped into the cell, not only is the resting potential of the cell established, but an unfavorable concentration gradient is created by increasing the concentration of sodium outside the cell and increasing the concentration of potassium within the cell. Although there is an excessive amount of potassium in the cell and sodium outside the cell, the generated resting potential keeps the voltage-gated ion channels in the plasma membrane closed, preventing the ions that have been pumped across the plasma membrane from diffusing to an area of lower concentration. Additionally, despite the high concentration of positively-charged potassium ions, most cells contain internal components (of negative charge), which accumulate to establish a negative inner-charge.

Depolarization

After a cell has established a resting potential, that cell has the capacity to undergo depolarization. During depolarization, the membrane potential rapidly shifts from negative to positive. For this rapid change to take place within the interior of the cell, several events must occur along the plasma membrane of the cell. While the sodium–potassium pump continues to work, the voltage-gated sodium and calcium channels that had been closed while the cell was at resting potential are opened in response to an initial change in voltage. As the sodium ions rush back into the cell, they add positive charge to the cell interior, and change the membrane potential from negative to positive. Once the interior of the cell becomes more positively charged, depolarization of the cell is complete, and the channels close again.

Repolarization

After a cell has been depolarized, it undergoes one final change in internal charge. Following depolarization, the voltage-gated sodium ion channels that had been open while the cell was undergoing depolarization close again. The increased positive charge within the cell now causes the potassium channels to open. Potassium ions (K+) begin to move down the electrochemical gradient (in favor of the concentration gradient and the newly established electrical gradient). As potassium moves out of the cell the potential within the cell decreases and approaches its resting potential once more. The sodium potassium pump works continuously throughout this process.

Hyperpolarization

The process of repolarization causes an overshoot in the potential of the cell. Potassium ions continue to move out of the axon so much so that the resting potential is exceeded and the new cell potential becomes more negative than the resting potential. The resting potential is ultimately re-established by the closing of all voltage-gated ion channels and the activity of the sodium potassium ion pump.

Neurons

Depolarization is essential to the functions of many cells in the human body, which is exemplified by the transmission of stimuli both within a neuron and between two neurons. The reception of stimuli, neural integration of those stimuli, and the neuron's response to stimuli all rely upon the ability of neurons to utilize depolarization to transmit stimuli either within a neuron or between neurons.

Response to stimulus
Stimuli to neurons can be physical, electrical, or chemical, and can either inhibit or excite the neuron being stimulated. An inhibitory stimulus is transmitted to the dendrite of a neuron, causing hyperpolarization of the neuron. The hyperpolarization following an inhibitory stimulus causes a further decrease in voltage within the neuron below the resting potential. By hyperpolarizing a neuron, an inhibitory stimulus results in a greater negative charge that must be overcome for depolarization to occur. Excitation stimuli, on the other hand, increases the voltage in the neuron, which leads to a neuron that is easier to depolarize than the same neuron in the resting state. Regardless of it being excitatory or inhibitory, the stimulus travels down the dendrites of a neuron to the cell body for integration.

Integration of stimuli

Once the stimuli have reached the cell body, the nerve must integrate the various stimuli before the nerve can respond. The stimuli that have traveled down the dendrites converge at the axon hillock, where they are summed to determine the neuronal response. If the sum of the stimuli reaches a certain voltage, known as the threshold potential, depolarization continues from the axon hillock down the axon.

Response

The surge of depolarization traveling from the axon hillock to the axon terminal is known as an action potential. Action potentials reach the axon terminal, where the action potential triggers the release of neurotransmitters from the neuron. The neurotransmitters that are released from the axon continue on to stimulate other cells such as other neurons or muscle cells. After an action potential travels down the axon of a neuron, the resting membrane potential of the axon must be restored before another action potential can travel the axon. This is known as the recovery period of the neuron, during which the neuron cannot transmit another action potential.

Rod cells of the eye

The importance and versatility of depolarization within cells can be seen in the relationship between rod cells in the eye and their associated neurons. When rod cells are in the dark, they are depolarized. In the rod cells, this depolarization is maintained by ion channels that remain open due to the higher voltage of the rod cell in the depolarized state. The ion channels allow calcium and sodium to pass freely into the cell, maintaining the depolarized state. Rod cells in the depolarized state constantly release neurotransmitters which in turn stimulate the nerves associated with rod cells. This cycle is broken when rod cells are exposed to light; the absorption of light by the rod cell causes the channels that had facilitated the entry of sodium and calcium into the rod cell to close. When these channels close, the rod cells produce fewer neurotransmitters, which is perceived by the brain as an increase in light. Therefore, in the case of rod cells and their associated neurons, depolarization actually prevents a signal from reaching the brain as opposed to stimulating the transmission of the signal.

Vascular endothelium

Endothelium is a thin layer of simple squamous epithelial cells that line the interior of both blood and lymph vessels. The endothelium that lines blood vessels is known as vascular endothelium, which is subject to and must withstand the forces of blood flow and blood pressure from the cardiovascular system. To withstand these cardiovascular forces, endothelial cells must simultaneously have a structure capable of withstanding the forces of circulation while also maintaining a certain level of plasticity in the strength of their structure. This plasticity in the structural strength of the vascular endothelium is essential to overall function of the cardiovascular system. Endothelial cells within blood vessels can alter the strength of their structure to maintain the vascular tone of the blood vessel they line, prevent vascular rigidity, and even help to regulate blood pressure within the cardiovascular system. Endothelial cells accomplish these feats by using depolarization to alter their structural strength. When an endothelial cell undergoes depolarization, the result is a marked decrease in the rigidity and structural strength of the cell by altering the network of fibers that provide these cells with their structural support. Depolarization in vascular endothelium is essential not only to the structural integrity of endothelial cells, but also to the ability of the vascular endothelium to aid in the regulation of vascular tone, prevention of vascular rigidity, and the regulation of blood pressure.

Heart

Depolarization occurs in the four chambers of the heart: both atria first, and then both ventricles.
 The sinoatrial (SA) node on the wall of the right atrium initiates depolarization in the right and left atria, causing contraction, which corresponds to the P wave on an electrocardiogram.
 The SA node sends the depolarization wave to the atrioventricular (AV) node which—with about a 100 ms delay to let the atria finish contracting—then causes contraction in both ventricles, seen in the QRS wave. At the same time, the atria re-polarize and relax.
 The ventricles are re-polarized and relaxed at the T wave.
This process continues regularly, unless there is a problem in the heart.

Depolarization blockers 
There are drugs, called depolarization blocking agents, that cause prolonged depolarization by opening channels responsible for depolarization and not allowing them to close, preventing repolarization. Examples include the nicotinic agonists, suxamethonium and decamethonium.

References

Further reading

External links
 

Membrane biology
Electrophysiology
Electrochemistry
Cellular neuroscience